WBMT (88.3 FM) is a radio station broadcasting an album oriented rock format. Licensed to Boxford, Massachusetts, United States.  The station is owned by Masconomet Regional School District.

Broadcasting from Masconomet Regional High School, the station is primarily run and managed by students as an extracurricular activity. Broadcasts usually occur on weekday afternoons until 9 P.M., as well as on weekend afternoons (the weekend schedule varies.) The station also conducts an annual "radiothon" every Memorial Day weekend, with sponsorship from local businesses.

References

External links

BMT
Radio stations established in 1978
High school radio stations in the United States
Mass media in Essex County, Massachusetts
Boxford, Massachusetts